This is a list of all episodes of The ABC Mystery Movie

ABC Monday Mystery Movie (1989)

ABC Saturday Mystery Movie (1989-90)

See also
Columbo
B.L. Stryker
Gideon Oliver
Kojak
Christine Cromwell

Lists of mystery television series episodes
The ABC Mystery Movie